Dr. Sanjaya Rajaram (1943–2021) was an Indian-born Mexican scientist and winner of the 2014 World Food Prize. He was awarded this prize for his scientific research in developing 480 wheat varieties that have been released in 51 countries. This innovation has led to an increase in world wheat production – by more than 200 million tons – building upon the successes of the Green Revolution. The Government of India awarded him highest civilian awards Padma Shri (2001) and Padma Bhushan (2022).

Early life, education and family 
Sanjaya Rajaram was born in 1943 near a small farming village Raipur, District Varanasi in the state of Uttar Pradesh in northern India. His family, including his parents, an older brother and a younger sister, made a meagre living on their five-hectare farm growing wheat, rice and maize. Unlike most children in his socioeconomic position, he was encouraged to pursue an education by his parents, and graduated from secondary school as the top-ranked student in the entire Varanasi District.

Rajaram went on to earn a B.Sc. in agriculture from the University of Gorakhpur, a M.Sc. in genetics and plant breeding from the Indian Agricultural Research Institute (IARI) in New Delhi and a Ph.D. in plant breeding from the University of Sydney. While at the IARI in 1964, he studied genetics and plant breeding under Prof. M.S. Swaminathan.

Career 
In 1969 Rajaram began working in Mexico as a wheat breeder at the International Maize and Wheat Improvement Center (CIMMYT). He was recruited by and worked alongside scientists Norman Borlaug and his deputy, Canadian Glenn Anderson, in experimental wheat fields in El Batan (Texcoco), and in the Mexican cities of Toluca and Ciudad Obregon, Sonora. In 1972, he became the director of CIMMYT at the age of 29.

After 33 years at CIMMYT, including seven as Director of the Global Wheat Program, Rajaram joined the International Center for Agricultural Research in the Dry Areas (ICARDA) as Director of Integrated Gene Management before formally retiring in 2008. During his distinguished career, Rajaram's work resulted in the release of more than 480 varieties of bread wheat in 51 countries, which are grown on more than 58 million hectares worldwide.

Rajaram, an elected Fellow of the National Academy of Agricultural Sciences, was also the owner and director of Resource Seed Mexicana, a small private company specializing in wheat development and promotion.

Rajaram died from COVID-19 on 17 February 2021 in  Ciudad Obregon, Mexico.

Awards and recognition
In 2022, Sanjay Rajaram received Padma Bhushan from Government of India which is the third Highest civilian award

Authored works 
 
 
  10 refs. CABD 20001009163.
 
 Cited at Norman Borlaug

References 

1943 births
2021 deaths
Indian emigrants to Mexico
Indian agriculturalists
Mexican people of Indian descent
Mexican scientists
People from Varanasi district
Naturalized citizens of Mexico
Fellows of the National Academy of Agricultural Sciences
Recipients of the Padma Shri in science & engineering
Recipients of Pravasi Bharatiya Samman
Agriculture and food award winners
Recipients of the Padma Bhushan in science & engineering